Darlinghurst was an electoral district of the Legislative Assembly in the Australian state of New South Wales. Named after and including Darlinghurst, it was created in the 1904 re-distribution of electorates following the 1903 New South Wales referendum, which required the number of members of the Legislative Assembly to be reduced from 125 to 90. It consisted of parts of Paddington and the abolished seats of Sydney-Fitzroy and Sydney-Bligh. It was abolished in 1920 with the introduction of proportional representation and was absorbed into the multi-member electorate of Sydney. It was briefly recreated in 1950 before being abolished in 1953.

Members for Darlinghurst

Election results

References

Former electoral districts of New South Wales
Constituencies established in 1904
Constituencies established in 1950
Constituencies disestablished in 1920
Constituencies established in 1953
1904 establishments in Australia
1920 disestablishments in Australia
1950 establishments in Australia
1953 disestablishments in Australia